This is a list of individuals with the most combined NBA championships. The National Basketball Association (NBA) is a major professional basketball league in North America. It was founded in 1946 as the Basketball Association of America (BAA). The league adopted its current name at the start of the  when it merged with the National Basketball League (NBL). The NBA Finals is the championship series for the NBA and the conclusion of the sport's postseason. The winning team's players, coaches, and members of the executive front office usually receive championship rings from the team honoring their contribution, with "rings" becoming shorthand for championships. However, in some rare occasion, the teams opted to give other commemorative items, such as wrist watches, instead of rings. An NBA team can choose who in their organization is awarded a ring; in addition to the players, coaches, and the front office, rings can and are awarded to trainers, medical staff, scouts, and occasionally cheerleaders, equipment managers, mascots and other arena staff. This list is limited to individuals who won a ring as at least one of the following:

 a player,
 a head coach,
 an assistant coach,
 a front office executive.

List 

 Bertka was also a scouting consultant on the 2018 Lakers championship staff.
 Winter was also a coaching consultant on the 2009 Lakers championship staff.

See also 

 List of NBA champions
 List of NBA championship head coaches
 List of NBA players with most championships

References

Citations

Sources 

most championships